Dimitar Zlatanov (born November 9, 1948 in Ihtiman) is a former Bulgarian volleyball player, who won the Silver medal at the 1980 Summer Olympics. The only Bulgarian member of the volleyball Hall of Fame in Holyoke, MA (USA), Number 1 striker in the world for 1970.

Since 1969 he played for CSKA.

9 times Champion of Bulgaria, once Champion of Europe, twice a finalist in the tournament, once third.

References

1948 births
Living people
Bulgarian men's volleyball players
Volleyball players at the 1968 Summer Olympics
Volleyball players at the 1972 Summer Olympics
Volleyball players at the 1980 Summer Olympics
Olympic volleyball players of Bulgaria
Olympic silver medalists for Bulgaria
Olympic medalists in volleyball
Medalists at the 1980 Summer Olympics
People from Ihtiman
Sportspeople from Sofia Province